Core-Mark Holding Company distributes fresh, chilled and frozen merchandise mainly to convenience stores in the United States. It also provides associated business services such as category management and management of promotions.

History
Core-Mark was started in San Francisco in 1888 by the Glaser brothers. After multi-generational ownership, the Glaser family sold the company to David Gillespie in 1974, who took the company public by listing on the Toronto Stock Exchange with Gerald Pickman COO and Jerry Goldman CFO in 1984. By late 1987, private equity firms were an integral part of the ownership and the company went private in 1989. Core-Mark remained private until June 2002 when it was sold to Fleming Companies, Inc. Less than one year later, in April 2003, Fleming filed for bankruptcy, taking Core-Mark with them. By August 2004, Core-Mark had emerged from the Fleming bankruptcy under the direction of President and CEO J. Michael Walsh. The company went public again in 2005 and listed on the NASDAQ stock exchange. Walsh remained the CEO until his retirement in January 2013. His successor, Thomas B. Perkins, led the Company until his retirement in June 2018.  Scott E. McPherson was appointed the CEO following the retirement of Perkins.  

Core-Mark was a marketer of food products to the convenience retail industry in North America. In 2021, when Core-Mark was acquired by Performance Food Group, Core-Mark served 44,000 customer locations in the U.S. and Canada and operated 32 distribution centers with headquarters in Westlake, TX and 8,100 employees throughout North America. Core-Mark serviced convenience retailers including traditional convenience stores as well as grocery stores, big box retailers, drug stores, liquor and specialty stores, and other stores that carry convenience products.

Notes

References

 CJonline.com, "Fleming files for bankruptcy; trading halted." The Capital Journal, 4/1/2003.
 Business.com, profile: Fleming Companies, Inc.
 Corporate-ir.net, Supervalu press release, 10 August 2006.
 Fleming Companies, Inc. — Pre- & Post-Bankruptcy Petition Copyright Infringement
 Sec.gov, August 22, 2008 — SEC Settles Enforcement Proceedings Against Former Fleming Companies, Inc. Executives Mark David Shapiro, Albert M. Abbood, and James H. Thatcher for Their Roles in Financial Fraud Scheme.
 Sec.gov, September 14, 2004 — Securities and Exchange Commission v. Dean Foods Company and John D. Robinson, Civil Action No. 4:04 CV-321/Eastern District of Texas (Sherman Division)- Securities and Exchange Commission v. Kemps LLC, f/k/a Marigold Foods LLC, James Green and Christopher Thorpe, Civil Action No. 4:04 CV-323/Eastern District of Texas (Sherman Division) — Securities and Exchange Commission v. Digital Exchange Systems, Inc., Rosario Coniglio and Steven Schmidt, Civil Action No. 4:04 CV-324/Eastern District of Texas (Sherman Division) — Securities and Exchange Commission v. John K. Adams, Civil Action No. 4:04 CV-322/Eastern District of Texas (Sherman Division) — Securities and Exchange Commission v. Bruce Keith Jensen, Civil Action No. 4:04 CV-320/Eastern District of Texas (Sherman Division).

External links
 

Companies formerly listed on the Nasdaq
Companies based in the Dallas–Fort Worth metroplex
American companies established in 1888
Business services companies established in 1888
1888 establishments in California
2002 mergers and acquisitions
Wholesalers of the United States
2021 mergers and acquisitions
2005 initial public offerings
Companies that filed for Chapter 11 bankruptcy in 2003